There were two Battles of Middlewich during the First English Civil War
 First Battle of Middlewich,  13 March 1643
 Second Battle of Middlewich, 26 December 1643

Middlewich